Khairagarh-Chhuikhadan-Gandai district is a district of the central Indian state of Chhattisgarh. It was carved out of Rajnandgaon in 2022.

Demographics 

At the time of the 2011 census, Khairagarh-Chhuikhadan-Gandai district had a population of 368,444. Khairagarh-Chhuikhadan-Gandai district has a sex ratio of 1018 females to 1000 males. 11.65% of the population lives in urban areas. Scheduled Castes and Scheduled Tribes make up 40,119 (10.89%) and 50,801 (13.79%) of the population respectively.

At the time of the 2011 Census of India, 93.97% of the population in the district spoke Chhattisgarhi, 2.97% Hindi and 2.21% Gondi as their first language.

References

Districts of Chhattisgarh